Leptosiphon androsaceus (syn. Linanthus androsaceus) is a species of flowering plant in the phlox family known by the common name false babystars.

Distribution
The plant is endemic to California, primarily in the San Francisco Bay Area, and also in the California Coast Ranges of northern and central California, the Southern Sierra Nevada, and the Peninsular Ranges and Transverse Ranges of southern California.

It grows below  in chaparral, oak woodland, and grassland habitats.

Similar species are: Leptosiphon latisectus, endemic to the Outer Northern California Coast Ranges; and Leptosiphon rosaceus, endemic to Central Coast and Bay Area shorelines.

Description
The oppositely arranged leaves are each divided into lobes up to 3 centimeters long and oval in shape to linear to needlelike.

The tip of the stem is occupied by an inflorescence of flowers one to three centimeters wide, usually pink or lavender with yellow or white throats. This plant is similar to its relative, true babystars (Leptosiphon bicolor).

Cultivation
The species is cultivated as an ornamental plant  for its small, colorful blooms in traditional, native plant, drought tolerant, and wildlife gardens.

See also

List of California native plants

References

External links
Calflora Database: Leptosiphon androsaceus
Jepson Manual eFlora (TJM2) treatment of Leptosiphon androsaceus
UC CalPhotos gallery: Leptosiphon androsaceus

androsaceus
Endemic flora of California
Natural history of the California chaparral and woodlands
Natural history of the California Coast Ranges
Natural history of the Peninsular Ranges
Natural history of the San Francisco Bay Area
Natural history of the Transverse Ranges
Garden plants of North America
Drought-tolerant plants
Flora without expected TNC conservation status